Alfred G. Gettins (July 1886 – 1949) was an English footballer who played for Bolton Wanderers, Blackpool, Luton Town, Queens Park Rangers, Aston Villa, Brighton & Hove Albion, Fulham, Portsmouth, Partick Thistle and Dumbarton.

References

1886 births
1949 deaths
Footballers from Manchester
English footballers
Dumbarton F.C. players
Partick Thistle F.C. players
Bolton Wanderers F.C. players
Queens Park Rangers F.C. players
Aston Villa F.C. players
Fulham F.C. players
Blackpool F.C. players
Luton Town F.C. players
Brighton & Hove Albion F.C. players
Portsmouth F.C. players
Stenhousemuir F.C. players
Scottish Football League players
English Football League players
Date of death missing
Place of death missing
Association football forwards